Matt Miller is a native of El Paso, Texas and the bassist for the Post-hardcore band, Sparta. He currently resides in Los Angeles, California.

Sparta
Matt Miller joined vocalist Jim Ward, drummer Tony Hajjar, and guitarist Paul Hinojos in Sparta a few months after its conception when original bassist Erick Sanger was let go from the group, and Miller's previous band Belknap broke up. The fact that Sparta was starting so soon after the break-up of his bandmates previous effort, At the Drive-In, did not faze Miller, though he knew the band would have a rough start. For the band's first record, Wiretap Scars, all members contributed lyrics, and Miller was no exception. Though Sparta's frontman Ward now takes on lyrical duties by himself; Miller has expanded his role in the group, now providing back-up vocals along with guitarist Keeley Davis (Hinojos has since left the group). Also, some songs on their latest album, Threes, are noticeably more bass orientated. The first single of the album, "Taking Back Control", opens with a bass heavy groove, and is Sparta's most successful single to date, reaching 24 on the U.S. Mainstream Rock charts. Miller refers to Threes as more positive than the previous records, and describes the addition of Davis as a breath of fresh air.

Discography

With Belknap
 Music is Our Blood, Blood is Our Bond (Compilation - 2002)
 Contributed the song "Sounds Like Paris"

With Sparta
 Austere (2002)
 Wiretap Scars (2002)
 Live at La Zona Rosa 3.19.04 (2004)
 Porcelain (2004)
 Threes (2006)

Equipment with Sparta
Miller uses several different bass guitars and amplifiers while performing with Sparta. While the equipment Miller uses changes over time, this is a list of some of the equipment he has used thus far.

Bass guitars
 Gretsch Broadkaster
 '69 Fender P-Bass
  Miller has two different P-Basses, one black and one off-white

Amplifiers
 Orange AD200 Bass Head
 Orange 4X10 Cabinet
 Orange 1X15 Cabinet
 '74 Ampeg B-15
 Marshall Head
 SWR Cabinet

References

External links
 Sparta's Official Site

Musicians from El Paso, Texas
Sparta (band) members
American rock bass guitarists
American male bass guitarists
Living people
Year of birth missing (living people)